The Try Out is a 1916 American silent comedy film featuring Oliver Hardy.

Cast
 Bobby Burns as Pokes
 Walter Stull as Jabbs
 Ethel Marie Burton as Ingenue (as Ethel Burton)
 Robin Williamson as A Tramp
 Harry Naughton as Cameraman
 Frank Hanson
 Oliver Hardy (as Babe Hardy)

See also
 List of American films of 1916
 Oliver Hardy filmography

External links

1916 films
American silent short films
American black-and-white films
1916 comedy films
1916 short films
Silent American comedy films
American comedy short films
1910s American films